Solja Rags is the second studio album by American rapper Juvenile. The album was released May 13, 1997, as the first release under Cash Money Records. This was also Juvenile's first album signed as an artist on Cash Money Records. The album sold over 200,000 copies independently. All the songs on the album were produced by Mannie Fresh.

Track listing
 All songs produced by Mannie Fresh.

Charts

References

1997 albums
Albums produced by Mannie Fresh
Juvenile (rapper) albums
Cash Money Records albums